Erin Sanders (born January 19, 1991) is an American actress. She is known for her roles as Quinn Pensky on Zoey 101, Camille Roberts on Big Time Rush, and for portraying Eden Baldwin on The Young and the Restless in 2008. She appeared as Chris on ABC Family's Melissa and Joey and starred in the film Guilty at 17, which premiered on Lifetime.

Life and career
Erin Sanders was born in Santa Monica, California. She has stated that she is a Jew. She identifies as bisexual.

At the age of 13, she began her starring role as Quinn Pensky on the Nickelodeon television series Zoey 101. Through all four seasons, Sanders played the resident science genius at Pacific Coast Academy and roommate of Zoey (portrayed by Jamie Lynn Spears).

Following Zoey 101, Sanders worked for several months on CBS's The Young and the Restless playing Eden Baldwin, the daughter of Michael Grossman.

In 2014 Sanders played the role of Chris on the third season of the ABC Family comedy Melissa and Joey. She has had guest-starring roles on many other television series, including Mad Men, Weeds, Castle, The Mentalist, and CSI: Miami. Sanders has also had roles in several independent films, and played the lead role of Traci in Guilty at 17 which premiered on Lifetime in 2014.

In 2020, she appeared in an episode of the Nickelodeon sketch comedy series All That in a sketch with many of her Zoey 101 co-stars.

On January 12, 2023, Jamie Lynn Spears announced that production had begun on a sequel film entitled, Zoey 102, set to premiere in 2023 on Paramount+, with original series cast members Spears, Sanders, Sean Flynn, Christopher Massey, and Matthew Underwood reprising their roles from Zoey 101.

Filmography

Awards and nominations

References

External links
 

1991 births
21st-century American actresses
American child actresses
Actresses from Santa Monica, California
American television actresses
Bisexual actresses
Jewish American actresses
LGBT Jews
LGBT people from California
Living people
American bisexual actors